Sir Hardman Earle, 1st Baronet (11 July 1792 – 25 January 1877) was a British railway director and slave owner. Earle owned plantations and enslaved people in what is now modern-day Guyana. He bought shares in the Liverpool to Manchester railway line and became a director of the company, which later amalgamated into the London and North Western Railway.

Early life
Earle was born on 11 July 1792. He was the fourth son of the slave trader, Thomas Earle. He was named after Sir John Hardman, an MP, slaver and owner of Allerton Hall. Earle attended Charterhouse School, then located in Charter House Square, London.

Slavery
Hardman Earle was a plantation and slave owner in what is now modern-day Guyana. His family were steeped in the slave trade, his father, Thomas Earle, grandfather William Earle and great grandfather John Earle were all slave traders. In 1833, slave ownership was abolished in the British colonies and with the Slave Compensation Act 1837, the British Government compensated the owners who were forced to free enslaved people. Hardman Earle was awarded £19,000, around £2.5m in 2020 money, in compensation; the former captives were not awarded anything. He had compensation for freeing enslaved people on the following plantations: Lynch's Estate, Blizards, Bodkin's (St Paul), Thibou's Estate, Gunthorpe's (St Georges) and Manning's Estate.

Railway director

Earle became known for his work on the railways. He bought shares in the Liverpool to Manchester Line and joined the company on the board of directors. He promoted the Grand Junction Railway which amalgamated with the Liverpool to Manchester Line and the London to Birmingham Line to become the London and North Western Railway (L&NWR). He was an active member of the North Union Railway board  which also became part of the L&NWR. He remained on the L&NWR board of directors until his death.

Politics
In 1869, Earle was awarded a baronetcy for his services to the Liberal Party.

Earlestown
Earlestown in Newton-le-Willows is named after him.

Allerton Tower
Earle bought part of the Allerton Hall Estate and on it built a mansion called Allerton Tower. It was a grand Italianate building with a tower, designed by Harvey Lonsdale Elmes. The mansion was demolished and only associated buildings remain. The locality has now become Allerton Tower Park.

Personal life
Earle married Mary Langton of Kirkham on 24 August 1819. He enjoyed fox hunting and continued in this pursuit until he died at the age of 84. Mary died in 1850 aged 52, Hardman died on 25 January 1877, both were buried at St Peter's Church, Woolton, Liverpool. A son was the soldier William Earle CB (1833 – 1885).

References

Sources

British slave owners
1792 births
1877 deaths
London and North Western Railway people
Baronets in the Baronetage of the United Kingdom
People educated at Charterhouse School